Brasidas (died 422 BC) was the most distinguished Spartan officer during the first decade of the Peloponnesian War who fought in battle of Amphipolis and Pylos. He died during the Second Battle of Amphipolis while winning one of his most spectacular victories.

Biography
Brasidas was the son of Tellis (Τέλλις) and Argileonis, and won his first laurels by the relief of Methone, which was besieged by the Athenians (431 BC). During the following year he seems to have been eponymous ephor, and in 429 BC he was sent out as one of the three commissioners to advise the admiral Cnemus. As trierarch he distinguished himself in the assault on the Athenian position at the Battle of Pylos, during which he was severely wounded 

In 424 BC, while Brasidas mustered a force at Corinth for a campaign in Thrace, he frustrated an Athenian attack on Megara. Immediately afterwards he marched through Thessaly at the head of 1,700 hoplites (700 helots and 1000 Peloponnesian mercenaries) and joined Perdiccas II of Macedon. The Macedonian king tried to use the Peloponnesian taskforce against the Lyncestians, a Macedonian tribe that had fallen out with their king, but Brasidas refused to be made a tool for the furtherance of Perdiccas's ambitions; he ignored the king's objections and received and negotiated with Arrhabaeus, the leader of the Lyncestians. After he settled with Arrhabaeus, Brasidas set about accomplishing his main objective, and, partly by the rapidity and boldness of his movements, partly by his personal charm and the moderation of his demands, succeeded during the course of the winter in winning over the important cities of Acanthus, Amphipolis (the main objective), Stagirus and Toroni as well as a number of minor towns, and most of the Chalcidic peninsulas . An attack on Eion was foiled by the arrival of Thucydides (the famous historian of the war, who at this time was serving as one of the Athenian generals) at the head of an Athenian squadron. In the spring of 423 BC a truce was concluded between Athens and Sparta, but it was at once imperiled by the city of Scione, which it transpired had come over to Brasidas two days after the truce began, which led to the Athenian requiring it to be returned to them. Brasidas refused to return Scione; and also accepted the revolt of Mende shortly afterwards. The Scionians granted Brasidas a golden crown and named him the liberator of Hellas.

An Athenian fleet under Nicias and Nicostratus recovered Mende and blockaded Scione, which fell two years later (421 BC). Meanwhile, Perdiccas forced Brasidas to join him in a campaign against Arrhabaeus and the Lyncestians. They soon met the Lyncestians in a pitched battle and were victorious, driving Arrhabaeus into the mountains. On the approach of a body of Illyrians, who, though summoned by Perdiccas, unexpectedly declared for Arrhabaeus, the Macedonians fled, and Brasidas's force was rescued from a critical position only by his coolness and ability (Battle of Lyncestis). This brought to a head the quarrel between Brasidas and Perdiccas (I.G. i. 42).

In April 422 BC, the truce with Sparta expired, and in the same summer Cleon was dispatched to Thrace, where he stormed Toroni and Galepsus and prepared for an attack on Amphipolis, the most important Athenian subject city in Chalcidice. When Cleon brought part of his army forward to probe the defenses, Brasidas recognized an opportunity to defeat his superior force in detail. Brasidas' plan for his final victory was typical of his campaigns in Thrace. It was a boldly aggressive surprise attack aimed to throw the enemy into confusion and it made the best possible use of both his small force of Spartan hoplites and his allies who made up the bulk of his army, in this case mostly Edonians from the city of Myrkinos.

Brasidas personally led the Spartans in a sudden charge from Amphipolis, routing the left wing of the Athenian army. His allies sallied from the northeastern gate and attacked from the north, breaking the enemy's right wing. Edonian and Chalcidian cavalry and light infantry pursued the fleeing Athenians, killing 600 men, including Cleon. On the Spartan side only seven fatalities are reported, but one of them was Brasidas, who was mortally wounded at the head of his Spartan troops. He was buried at Amphipolis within the city limits (an extraordinary honor among the ancient Greeks) with impressive pomp, and for the future was regarded as the founder (oikistes) of the city and honored with yearly games and sacrifices. At Sparta a cenotaph was erected in his memory near the tombs of Pausanias and Leonidas, and yearly speeches were made and games celebrated in their honor, in which only Spartiates could compete.

Legacy 
Ch. Koukouli-Chrysanthaki in her three-decade research at Amphipolis offers evidence of the recovery and identification of Brasidas' burial at the ancient Amphipolis' agora. According to the Greek historian Thucydides, Brasidas's grave was placed in front of the new, relocated agora of Amphipolis. An archaeological dig at Amphipolis unearthed the foundations of a small building, and a cist grave containing the remains of a silver ossuary accompanied by a gold wreath, believed to hold the remains of Brasidas. This ossuary is currently located in the Archaeological Museum of Amphipolis. The grave itself was a hole dug into the existing rock, with limestone blocks and mortar used to create the cist grave.

Thucydides' characterization of Brasidas suggests that Brasidas united in himself the stereotypical Spartan courage with those virtues in which regular Spartans were most signally lacking. Brasidas was apparently quick in forming his plans and carried them out without delay or hesitation. Furthermore, the rhetoric in the speech of Brasidas to the Acanthians is of noticeably higher quality than the other Spartan speeches recorded by Thucydides (Thuc. iv. 84-89). It appears that Brasidas's un-Spartan virtues raised jealousy and suspicion at Sparta.

See in particular Thucydides; what Diodorus xii. adds is mainly oratorical elaboration or pure invention. A fuller account will be found in the histories of Greece (e.g. those of George Grote, Karl Julius Beloch, Georg Busolt, Eduard Meyer) and in Gustav Schimmelpfeng, De Brasidae Spartani rebus gestis atque ingenio (Marburg, 1857).

In popular culture  
Brasidas appears in the 2018 video game Assassin's Creed Odyssey. Brasidas is portrayed in the game as a powerful warrior and close friend of the protagonist.

Quotes

 "Make no show of cowardice then on your part, seeing the greatness of the issues at stake, and I will show that what I preach to others I can practice myself" (Strassler 307/5.9.10).
 "Not a bad speaker either, for a Spartan" (Thucydides 4.84)
 "He did the Lacedaemonians very great service" (Thucydides 4.81)

See also
History of the Peloponnesian War

References

External links
Brasidas by Jona Lendering

422 BC deaths
Ancient Spartan generals
5th-century BC Spartans
Spartans of the Peloponnesian War
Ancient Greeks killed in battle
Ancient Amphipolis
Year of birth unknown
Ephors